Choi Hyun (born 7 November 1978) is a retired South Korean footballer who played as goalkeeper.

Club career 
He formerly played for Jeju United, Busan IPark and Daejeon Citizen.

Career statistics

Club

External links

1978 births
Living people
Association football goalkeepers
South Korean footballers
Jeju United FC players
Gyeongnam FC players
Busan IPark players
Daejeon Hana Citizen FC players
K League 1 players
Footballers at the 2000 Summer Olympics
Olympic footballers of South Korea
Sportspeople from Busan
Chung-Ang University alumni